Morton Goldberg or Larry Johnston (December 17, 1916 – February 22, 1996), nicknamed "Boston Shorty", was an American professional pool player. Born in Rochester, New York, Goldberg beat such famous pool players as Minnesota Fats, Irving Crane, and Willie Mosconi.

Biography 
Morton Goldberg was born in Rochester, New York in 1916. Goldberg joined the US Army in 1942 when he was 25 years old. At the time of his enlistment, he was the New York State billiard champion, a title he had held for several years, having defeated some of the top players, including Willie Mosconi, Jimmy Caras, Ralph Greenleaf, Irving Crane, and Erwin Rudolph. For much of his service time, he was stationed in Boston. When he wasn't cooking for the troops, he played pool. Goldberg beat such famous pool players as Minnesota Fats, Irving Crane, and Willie Mosconi.

It was in Boston that Pfc. Goldberg met Willie Hoppe (the world's champion billiard player) for a second time—Goldberg had lost to Hoppe at an exhibition in Poughkeepsie in 1939. The two provided a brilliant exhibition of billiard skill, held at Fort Heath. The match was one between champions, both expert in the game, and the remarkable precision shown by both players brought gasps of amazement from the huge crowd of onlookers. Goldberg lost the game, 9 to 14, but his playing was so brilliant against tall, long-armed Willie Hoppe that the soldiers of the post gave Goldberg the nickname, "Boston Shorty".

Titles
 1965 Johnston City One Pocket Championship
 1966 Stardust Open One Pocket Championship
 1967 Johnston City One Pocket Championship
 1967 Columbus 14.1 Championship
 1967 Capital Q 3-Cushion Open
 1968 Johnston City One Pocket Championship
 1969 BCA U.S. Open 3-Cushion Championship
 1970 BCA U.S. Open 3-Cushion Championship
 1971 Silver Cue 3-Cushion Billiard Open
 1972 Johnston City One Pocket Championship
 1972 Johnston City Nine-Ball Championship
 1972 Johnston City All-Around Championship
 1973 Stardust Open Eight-Ball Championship
 1973 Stardust Open All-Around Championship
 1973 New England 14.1 Championship
 1975 Hi-Cue 3-Cushion Open
 1975 Massachusetts One Pocket Championship 
 1976 Challenge 3-Cushion Tournament
 1976 New England 14.1 Championship
 1976 BCA U.S. Open 3-Cushion Championship
 1977 Big Apple 3-Cushion Tournament 
 1978 Las Vegas 3-Cushion Tournament 
 1978 New York 3-Cushion Tournament 
 1980 Billiard News National Open 3-Cushion 
 1985 Resorts International Last Call For 9-Ball Seniors 
 1988 Boston 9-Ball Open 
 1994 New England Pool and Billiards Hall of Fame 
 1999 Billiard Congress of America Hall of Fame
 2004 One Pocket Hall of Fame

References

American pool players
Sportspeople from Rochester, New York
Jewish American sportspeople
Burials at Mount Hope Cemetery (Rochester)
1916 births
1996 deaths
United States Army personnel of World War II
20th-century American Jews